The Lower Salmon River Archeological District is a  historic district listed on the National Register of Historic Places in 1986.  It included 213 contributing sites.

The district spans across parts of Idaho County, Lewis County and Nez Perce County counties of Idaho.  It extends along  of the lower Salmon River.

Archeological studies were conducted in the area during 1961 to 1964 by the Idaho State College Museum, and by other entities at later dates.

This area includes the Cooper's Ferry site.

References

External links

Archaeological sites on the National Register of Historic Places in Idaho
Historic districts on the National Register of Historic Places in Idaho
Idaho County, Idaho